Praia de Cabral is a beach on the northwest coast of the island of Boa Vista in Cape Verde in the immediate area of the town of Sal Rei. Nearby in Praia de Fátima is an abandoned chapel of Our Lady of Fatima.

See also
Tourism in Cape Verde

References

External links
Praia de Cabral  cabo-verde-foto.com, in English, German and in Portuguese

Beaches of Cape Verde
Geography of Boa Vista, Cape Verde
Sal Rei